= Copulative =

Copulative may refer to:

- Copula (linguistics), a part of speech
- Copulation (zoology), the union of the sex organs of two sexually reproducing animals for insemination and subsequent internal fertilization
